Santiago Municipality may refer to:
 Santiago (commune), Chile
 Santiago, Norte de Santander, Colombia
 Santiago, Rio Grande do Sul, Brazil
 Santiago, Agusan del Norte, Philippines
 Santiago, Ilocos Sur, Philippines

Municipality name disambiguation pages